The religion in Liechtenstein is predominantly Catholic, with a minority of Protestants, non-adherents, and adherents of other religions. Liechtenstein has a small Muslim population, composed mainly of immigrants from countries like Bosnia and Herzegovina, Serbia, and Turkey.

Overview

Liechtenstein is a small, landlocked country located in the Alpine region of Europe. As of 2002, 83.9% of Liechtenstein's population is Christian. In terms of religious demographics, 76% are Catholic, 7% are Protestant, 4.2% follow Islam, 0.8% follow Orthodox Christianity, and 12% are either nonreligious or adherents of other faiths. In Liechtenstein, 44% of Muslims, 23% of Catholic Christians, and 24% of non-Catholic Christians regularly participate in weekly religious services.

The Catholic Church, as written in the Constitution of Liechtenstein, is the official state religion of Liechtenstein. The constitution declares that the Catholic Church is "the State Church and as such shall enjoy the full protection of the State." Liechtenstein offers protection to adherents of all religious beliefs, and considers the "religious interests of the people" a priority of the government. In Liechtenstein schools, although exceptions are allowed, religious education in Catholicism or Protestantism is legally required. Tax exemption is granted by the government to religious organizations. According to the Pew Research Center, social conflict caused by religious hostilities is ranked low in Liechtenstein, and so is the amount of government restriction on the practice of religion.

Before 1997, within the Catholic church, the principality was part of the Swiss Diocese of Chur. Reforms aimed at diminishing the influence of the Catholic Church on Liechtenstein's government have been supported by Prince Hans-Adam II.

See also
 Catholic Church in Liechtenstein
 Islam in Liechtenstein

References